Beniel is a municipality in the autonomous Region of Murcia in southeastern Spain, it is located in the east of the region and shares borders with the province of Alicante in its east.

References

Municipalities in the Region of Murcia